Third Eye is the sole studio album by British band Monsoon.

Track listing
"Wings of the Dawn (Prem Kavita)" (Steve Coe, Martin Smith, Jhalib) – 3:56
"Tomorrow Never Knows" (John Lennon, Paul McCartney) – 4:01
"Third Eye and Tikka T.V." (Coe) – 2:53
"Eyes" (Coe, Smith) – 3:41
"Shakti (The Meaning of Within)" (Coe) – 4:04
"Ever So Lonely" (Coe) – 6:12
"You Can't Take Me with You" (Coe, Smith) – 3:04
"And I You" (Coe) – 3:28
"Kashmir" (Coe, Smith) – 4:00
"Watchers of the Night" (Coe, Smith) – 3:47

Monsoon featuring Sheila Chandra
In 1995, the album was re-released under the above title with the following extra tracks:

"Indian Princess" – 3:20
"Sunset over the Ganges" – 3:16
"Ever So Lonely (Hindi Version)" – 5:55
"Wings of the Dawn (Prem Kavita) (Hindi Version)" – 4:02
"Ever So Lonely (Ben Chapman Remix)" – 6:24
"Ever So Lonely (Ben Chapman Instrumental Remix)" – 6:21

Personnel
Sheila Chandra – lead vocal, backing vocals
Steve Coe – pianos, celeste, swarmandel, gong, organ, cabasa, backing vocals
Martin Smith – 8-string bass guitar, 4-string bass guitar, accordion, tamboura, piano, sitar, tabla, ektara, backing vocals

with

Dari Mankoo – sitar
Clem Alford – sitar
Jhalib – tabla, Indian percussion

Guest musicians

Dinesh – tabla
Preston Heyman – ghatam, gamelan, timbali, gong, cowbell, rototoms, tom-toms, wasp, tambourines, cabasa, fire extinguisher
Bill Nelson – electric guitars
Paul James – shenai, pipes, recorders
Cliff Stapleton – hurdy-gurdy

on "Kashmir"

Richard Bragg – mandolin
Norman Bragg – mandolin
Deepak Khazanchi – santoor
Chris Hunter – flute
Punita Gupta – sitar

on "Tomorrow Never Knows"

Dave Balfe – synthesizer
 Merrick – drums

Recording
Recorded at Rockfield Studios, Wales
Additional recording and mixing at Sarm Studios, London

 Hugh Jones and Steve Coe – producer
 Hugh Jones – engineer
 Stuart Bruce – assistant engineer (Sarm Studios)
 Julian Mendelsohn – assistant engineer (Sarm Studios)

Release history

References
Liner notes to Third Eye (Great Expectations PIPCD 001)
Monsoon at www.discogs.com

1983 debut albums
Monsoon (band) albums
Mercury Records albums
Albums recorded at Rockfield Studios